Mary Ann Nichols, known as Polly Nichols (née Walker; 26 August 184531 August 1888), was the first canonical victim of the unidentified serial killer known as Jack the Ripper, who is believed to have murdered and mutilated at least five women in and around the Whitechapel district of London from late August to early November 1888.

The two previous murders linked to the Whitechapel murderer are unlikely to have been committed by Jack the Ripper, although the murder of Mary Ann Nichols was initially linked to this series, increasing both press and public interest into the criminal activity and general living conditions of the inhabitants of the East End of London.

Early life
Mary Ann Nichols was born Mary Ann Walker on 26 August 1845 in either Dean Street, off Fetter Lane in London, or Dawes Court, Shoe Lane (off Fleet Street), London. She was the second of three children born to Edward Walker, a locksmith (later a blacksmith), and Caroline (née Webb), a laundress. Little is known of her early life, although she is known to have been christened by the year 1851.

At age 18, Walker married a printer's machinist named William Nichols. The ceremony was conducted on 16 January 1864 at Saint Bride's Parish Church in the City of London and was witnessed by two individuals named Seth George Havelly and Sarah Good. Following their marriage, the couple briefly lodged at 30–31 Bouverie Street before residing with Mary Ann's father at 131 Trafalgar Street. Between 1866 and 1879, the couple had five children: Edward John (b. 1866), Percy George (b. 1868), Alice Esther (b. 1870), Eliza Sarah (b. 1877), and Henry Alfred (b. 1879). Nichols was 5 feet 2 inches tall, had brown eyes, high cheekbones and, at the time of her death, greying dark brown hair.

Separation
On 6 September 1880, the couple moved into their own home at 6 D-Block, Peabody Buildings, Stamford Street, Blackfriars Road, paying a weekly rent of 5s. 9d. Shortly thereafter, the couple separated due to disputed causes, with William later relocating with four of his children to an address near Old Kent Road.

Nichols's father accused William of leaving his daughter after he had conducted an affair with the nurse who had attended the birth of their final child, though William Nichols claimed to have proof that their marriage had continued for at least three years after the date of this alleged affair, claiming their marital troubles had been caused by his wife's heavy drinking, and that he had embarked upon an affair only after Nichols had left him. He later maintained to authorities that his wife had deserted him and was practising prostitution.

Over the following years, Nichols amassed a lengthy police record, although all of her arrests were for minor offences such as drunkenness, disorderly conduct, and prostitution.

1881–1887
By 1881, Nichols is known to have resided at Lambeth Workhouse, where she described herself as a charwoman. She left this workhouse on 31 May. Her movements over much of the following year are unknown, although on 24 April 1882, she again returned to the Lambeth Workhouse. She is known to have lived with her father in Walworth for several months in 1883 before leaving his residence following a quarrel.

Legally required to support his estranged wife, William Nichols initially paid her a weekly allowance of five shillings until the spring of 1882, when he received word that she was working as a prostitute. Upon hearing this news, he ceased making these payments, causing Nichols to send summons via the Lambeth Union requesting the continuance of this weekly allowance. When parish authorities attempted to collect the maintenance money, William explained his wife had deserted her family, leaving their children in his care, and was living with another man, earning money through prostitution. As he was not legally required to support his wife if she was earning money through illicit means, Nichols no longer received any maintenance payments from her husband.

Nichols spent the majority of her remaining years in workhouses and boarding houses, living off charitable handouts and her meagre earnings as a prostitute, although she frequently spent her earnings on alcohol. By 1887, she had formed a relationship with a widower and father of three named Thomas Stuart Drew, although the couple separated on 24 October. By December 1887, Nichols had begun sleeping rough in Trafalgar Square, although a clearance of the area on 19 December resulted in her returning to Lambeth Workhouse. On this occasion, she remained at this workhouse for less than two weeks.

1888
In April 1888, the matron of Lambeth Workhouse, a Mrs Fielder, found Nichols employment as a domestic servant to a Mr and Mrs Cowdry in Wandsworth. Shortly after taking this employment, Nichols is known to have written a letter to her father describing her general contentment with the position, stating: "I just write to say you will be glad to know that I am settled in my new place, and going on all right up to now. My people went out yesterday, and have not returned, so I am in charge. It's a grand place inside, with trees and gardens back and front. All has been newly done up. They are teetotallers, and religious, so I ought to get on. They are very nice people, and I have not too much to do. I hope you are all right and the boy has work. So goodbye for the present. From yours truly, Polly."

Possibly because Nichols was an alcoholic and her employers were teetotallers, she left this employment after just three months of service, stealing clothing worth £3 10s. and absconding from the premises. Her father was informed of this fact via postcard on 12 July, in response to his attempted return correspondence with his daughter.

By the summer of 1888, Nichols resided in a common lodging-house at 18 Thrawl Street, Spitalfields, where she shared a bed with an elderly woman named Emily "Nelly" Holland. She relocated to an alternative common lodging-house at 56 Flower and Dean Street, Whitechapel, on 24 August.

30–31 August
At approximately 11:00 p.m. on 30 August, Nichols was seen walking along Whitechapel Road. She visited the Frying Pan public house in Brick Lane, Spitalfields, leaving at 0:30 a.m. on 31 August. By 1:20 a.m., she had returned to the kitchen of her Flower and Dean Street lodging-house. Fifty minutes later, she was seen by the deputy lodging house keeper, who asked her for the 4d required for her bed. When Nichols replied she did not have the money, she was ordered to leave the premises. Unconcerned, Nichols motioned to her new black velvet bonnet, replying: "I'll soon get my doss money. See what a jolly bonnet I've got now." She then left the lodging-house with a likely intention of earning the money to pay for a bed via prostituting herself.

Nichols was last seen alive by Emily Holland, walking alone down Osborn Street at approximately 2:30 a.m. (approximately one hour before her death). To Holland, Nichols seemed notably drunk, at one stage slumping against the wall of a grocer's shop. Holland attempted to persuade Nichols to return to her Thrawl Street lodging-house, but Nichols refused, stating: "I have had my lodging money three times today, and I have spent it." Holland noted Nichols seemed unconcerned about her prospects of earning the 4d. required to pay for her bed. The two parted company, with Nichols walking towards Whitechapel Road.

Murder
At 3:40 a.m., a carman named Charles Allen Cross (birth name Lechmere) discovered what he initially believed to be a tarpaulin lying on the ground in front of a gated stable entrance in Buck's Row (renamed Durward Street in 1892), Whitechapel, as he walked to his place of employment in Broad Street. The location was approximately 150 yards from the London Hospital (now renamed Royal London Hospital) and 100 yards from Blackwall Buildings.

Upon inspecting the object, Cross discovered the tarpaulin was actually the body of a woman. She lay on her back with her eyes open, her legs straight, her skirt raised above her knees and her left hand touching the gate of the stable entrance. Another passing cart driver on his way to work, Robert Paul, approached the location and observed Cross standing in the road, staring at her body. Cross called him over, and both men walked towards the body, which they examined. Cross touched the woman's face, which was still warm, then her hands, which were cold. He expressed his opinion to Paul that the woman was dead, but Paul was uncertain and thought she may simply be unconscious. The two pulled her skirt down to cover her lower body, then went in search of a policeman. Upon encountering PC Jonas Mizen at the corner of Hanbury Street and Baker's Row, Cross informed the constable of their discovery, adding: "She looks to me to be either dead or drunk, but for my part, I believe she's dead." The two men then continued on their way to work, leaving Mizen to inspect their discovery.

Shortly before Mizen reached Buck's Row, PC John Neil approached the street from the opposite direction on his beat, illuminating Nichols's body with his lantern. By flashing this lantern, Neil attracted the attention of PC John Thain, as his beat passed the entrance to Buck's Row, shouting: "Here's a woman with her throat cut. Run at once for Dr Llewellyn." Neil then inspected the crime scene to look for blood trails with his lantern. He saw none. He also examined the road, but saw no marks of wheels.

PC Thain fetched surgeon Dr Llewellyn, who arrived in Buck's Row at 4:00 a.m. Llewellyn observed that two deep knife wounds had been inflicted to the woman's throat, and quickly pronounced her life extinct, determining through the fact her body and legs were still warm that she had been dead for approximately 30 minutes. He then ordered PC Neil to remove the body to the Old Montague Street Mortuary upon a handcart Mizen had fetched, stating: "Move the woman to the mortuary; she is dead. I will make a further examination of her."

As news of the murder spread, many individuals converged on the scene. Among them were three horse slaughterers from a neighbouring knacker's yard in Winthrop Street named Harry Tomkins, James Mumford and Charles Britten. Each had been informed of the murder by PC Thain as he walked past them to fetch Dr Llewellyn. All three were interrogated, with Tomkins and Britten admitting to having left their workplace at 12:20 a.m. for approximately thirty minutes, possibly for a drink at the nearby Roebuck public house. All three were eliminated as suspects. Police questioning of all tenants of Buck's Row—including the residents of the property closest to where Nichols's body was discovered—revealed that although several residents had been awake in the early hours, none had seen or heard anything amiss. All police officers patrolling along or near Buck's Row in the early hours of 31 August also reported hearing and seeing nothing suspicious before the discovery of Nichols's body.

Post-mortem
Nichols's body was moved into the Old Montague Street Mortuary at 5:20 a.m. The injuries to her abdomen were discovered by an Inspector Spratling, who immediately sent for Dr Llewellyn, who had initially returned to his home.

Upon further examination of Nichols's body, Dr Llewellyn discovered that both sides of her face had been bruised by either a fist or the pressure of a thumb before her throat wounds had been inflicted from left to right. One of these two wounds measured eight inches and the other four inches in length; both reached back to her vertebral column. Her vagina had been stabbed twice, and her abdomen had been mutilated with one deep, jagged wound two or three inches from the left side. Several incisions had also been inflicted across her abdomen, causing her bowels to protrude through the wounds, and three or four similar cuts ran down the right side of her body. These cuts had also been inflicted with the same knife, estimated to be at least 6–8 inches (15–20 cm) long, and possibly a cork-cutter or shoemaker's knife. Each wound had been inflicted in a violent and downward thrusting manner. Llewellyn further opined his belief the murderer possessed some anatomical knowledge. No organs were missing.

Llewellyn estimated the injuries would have taken four to five minutes to complete, and also expressed his surprise at the small amount of blood at the crime scene, "about enough to fill two large wine glasses, or half a pint at the outside". He believed Nichols had been facing her attacker when he had held his hand across her mouth before cutting her throat. Death would have been instantaneous, and all her abdominal injuries, which would have taken less than five minutes to perform, were made by the murderer after she was dead. Llewellyn was able to determine this fact because wounds inflicted to an individual's body after death do not result in blood spattering and may not result in an extensive amount of blood loss from the body.

Identification
An examination of Nichols's possessions revealed she carried no form of identification at the time of her death, with her sole possessions being a white pocket handkerchief, a comb, and a piece of mirror. However, her petticoats were marked 'Lambeth Workhouse P.R.' indicating she may have resided at the workhouse on Princess Road, which had only opened in 1887. Although the matron of this workhouse was unable to identify the body, a workhouse inmate named Mary Ann Monk positively identified the body as that of Mary Ann Nichols at 7:30 p.m. on 31 August. Earlier the same afternoon, Emily Holland also identified the deceased as "Polly" Nichols. This identification was later corroborated by William Nichols the following day. Reportedly, upon confirming Nichols's identity, William had exclaimed: "I forgive you, as you are, for what you have been to me."

Inquest
The official inquest into Nichols's death was opened at the Working Lads' Institute on Whitechapel Road on Saturday, 1 September. This inquest was presided over by the Middlesex coroner, Wynne Edwin Baxter. The first day of the inquest saw the jury duly sworn before being taken by the coroner's assistant to view Nichols's body at the mortuary in Pavilion Yard before reconvening at the Working Lads' Institute.

The first day of the inquest heard testimony from three witnesses. The first witness to testify was Nichols's father, who stated his daughter had been separated from her husband for "about seven or eight years", and that he had not seen his daughter since Easter, and that she had no enemies. Also to testify was PC John Neil, who testified to his discovery of Nichols's body, adding the actual location of the murder was dimly lit, adding the closest source of illumination was "a street lamp shining at the end of the row". Describing the crime scene and his summoning of assistance, Neil stated: "Deceased was lying lengthways along the street, her left hand touching the gate. I examined the body by the aid of my lamp, and noticed blood oozing from a wound in the throat. She was lying on her back, with her clothes disarranged. I felt her arm, which was quite warm from the joints upwards. Her eyes were wide open. Her bonnet was off and lying at her side, close to the left hand. I heard a constable passing Brady Street, so I called him." In response to questioning from the coroner, Neil conceded Whitechapel Road was "fairly busy" even at the time of his discovery of Nichols's body, and that her murderer could have escaped in that direction.

The final witness to testify on the first day of the inquest was Dr Llewellyn. His testimony, as reported in The Times on 3 September, is as follows:

Following the testimony of Dr Llewellyn, hearings were adjourned until 3 September.

Police testimony
Inspector John Spratling gave evidence on the second day of the inquest. Spratling testified to having first heard of the murder at 4:30 a.m., by which time Nichols's body had been transferred to the mortuary, and confirmed that only PC Neil's beat required him to walk through Buck's Row. His subsequent questioning of several residents revealed none had seen or heard anything amiss. Also to testify was horse slaughterer Harry Tomkins, who testified he had not left his place of work after 1:00 a.m. on 31 August and that he and his colleagues had not heard anything untoward. Questioned as to the noise level in his workplace, Tomkins stated his workplace was "very quiet", although he conceded he had been too far from the crime scene to have heard any cries for help.

Two police officers followed Tomkins to the stand. Inspector Joseph Helson testified to his opinion the decedent had not been carried to the spot where her body was found. PC Jonas Mizen testified to having been informed of a woman lying in Buck's Row by a carman at 3:45 a.m. on Friday morning and that when he had arrived at the scene, PC Neil immediately ordered him to fetch a handcart.

Charles Cross followed PC Mizen to the stand. He testified to having discovered Nichols's body en route to his workplace, and that he had initially assumed her body to be a tarpaulin, before realising the figure was a woman. He had then heard the footsteps of Robert Paul approaching behind him, and had motioned to him, stating, "Come and look over here; there is a woman lying on the pavement." Cross testified Paul had touched Nichols's heart, stating, "I think she is breathing, but very little, if she is." As both men were late for work, they had then left the woman, resolving to report their discovery to the first policeman they encountered.

Questioned as to why neither man had noted the wounds to Nichols's throat, Cross stated Buck's Row was poorly illuminated.

Character testimony
William Nichols also testified on the second day of the inquest. He confirmed he had not seen his wife for approximately three years, and that she left him of her own accord due to her alcoholism. He further testified he had no knowledge of his wife's whereabouts or activities in the years immediately before her murder.

Two women who had known Nichols in the years following her separation from her husband then testified before the jury. Emily Holland testified she had resided at the same common lodging-house as Nichols in the summer of 1888, and had observed her to be a "quiet woman" who mostly kept to herself. She stated she had not seen Nichols for about ten days prior to encountering her by chance on Osborne Street in the early hours of 31 August, stating she would soon be back at her lodging house. Mary Ann Monk then testified to having observed Nichols entering a pub in New Kent Road at approximately 7:00 p.m. on the evening prior to her murder. Monk also testified she had no knowledge of how Nichols earned her living.

Day three
The third day of the inquest was held on Monday 17 September. Eight witnesses testified on this date, including Mrs Emma Green, a widow who lived with her three children in the cottage immediately alongside the stable entrance where Nichols's body was found. Green stated she had heard nothing unusual on the night of the murder and that, although rowdy individuals often walked along Buck's Row, all the houses were occupied by hardworking individuals. Also to testify was PC John Thain, who stated his beat typically took him past Buck's Row every thirty minutes, and that he had been signalled onto Buck's Row by PC Neil at 3:45 a.m. Thain testified he had been immediately dispatched to fetch Dr Llewellyn and that the body was taken to the mortuary as he remained in Buck's Row. He had then searched Essex Wharf, the Great Eastern Railway arches, and the District Railway for evidence, but had found nothing.

Two of the final witnesses to testify on 17 September were the keeper of the Old Montague Street Mortuary, Robert Mann, and an inmate of the Whitechapel Workhouse named James Hatfield. Mann testified to placing the body inside the mortuary at 5:00 a.m., adding her clothes were not cut before he and Hatfield cut them from her body. Hatfield then testified he and Mann—contrary to instructions given by a Sergeant Enright—had removed all Nichols's clothing in preparation for the arrival of Dr Llewellyn.

Following Hatfield's testimony, the coroner adjourned proceedings until 22 September.

Conclusion
On the final day of hearings, signalman Thomas Ede was recalled to expound upon previous testimony he had provided on the third day of hearings regarding having seen a man named Henry James walking with a knife protruding from his pocket at noon on the date of the murder of Annie Chapman.

At the conclusion of this final day of hearings, coroner Baxter informed the panel the condition of Nichols's body appeared to prove conclusively that she had been murdered at the location where her body was found. Referencing the murderer's ability to escape detection, Baxter stated: "It seems astonishing, at first thought, that the culprit should have escaped detection, for there must surely have been marks of blood about his person. If, however, blood was principally on his hands, the presence of so many slaughterhouses in the neighbourhood would make the frequenters of this spot familiar with bloodstained clothes and hands, and his appearance might in that way have failed to attract attention while he passed from Buck's Row in the twilight into Whitechapel Road, and was lost sight of in the morning's market traffic." Baxter further referenced the two earlier Whitechapel murders and the 8 September murder of Annie Chapman, informing the jury: "We cannot altogether leave unnoticed the fact that the death that you have been investigating is one of four presenting many points of similarity, all of which have occurred within the space of about five months, and all within a very short distance of the place where we are sitting. All four victims were women of middle age, all were married, and had lived apart from their husbands in consequence of intemperate habits, and were at the time of their death leading an irregular life."

Referencing the direct similarities between Nichols's murder and the murder of Annie Chapman as opposed to the earlier murders of Emma Smith and Martha Tabram, Baxter elaborated: "The similarity of the injuries in the [murders of Nichols and Chapman] is considerable. There are bruises about the face in both cases; the head is nearly severed from the body in both cases; there are other dreadful injuries in both cases; and those injuries again have in each case been performed with anatomical knowledge ... I suggest to you as a possibility that these two women may have been murdered by the same man with the same object." Baxter further dismissed the possibility of Nichols's murder being connected with the two previous Whitechapel murders, as the murder weapon used was significantly different in both cases, and neither of these victims had received slash wounds to the throat or any disembowelment.

Following a 20-minute deliberation, the jury, having been instructed to consider precisely how, when, and by what means Nichols came about her death, returned a verdict: "Wilful murder against some person or persons unknown."

Press reaction
Nichols's murder had occurred within a 300-yard radius of the previous murders of Emma Smith and Martha Tabram, and all three murders had occurred in the space of less than five months. Although the modus operandi of all three murders differed, the geographical similarities led elements of the press to link the three murders. Editors also suggested Nichols's killing may have been perpetrated by a gang, as had earlier been speculated in relation to Smith's murder.

In the days following Nichols's murder, some sections of the Radical press—in particular reporters within The Star—capitalized on the brutal nature of the murders in an effort to vilify Police Commissioner Sir Charles Warren, falsely claiming as early as 1 September that widespread dissatisfaction against Warren existed within the Metropolitan Police. A reporter for The Star newspaper named Ernest Parke also suggested in the 31 August edition that a single killer was the culprit. Other publications soon adopted this narrative.

Suspicions a serial killer may be at large in the East End led to the secondment of Detective Inspectors Frederick Abberline, Henry Moore and Walter Andrews from the Central Office at Scotland Yard.

The subsequent murders of Elizabeth Stride and Catherine Eddowes the week after the inquest had closed, and that of Mary Jane Kelly on 9 November, were also linked by a similar modus operandi, and the murders were blamed by the press and public on a single serial killer, known by October 1888 as "Jack the Ripper".

Leather Apron
Local rumours that a local Jew known as "Leather Apron" may have been responsible for the murders were investigated by the police. This individual was known to have carried a knife and to have frequently intimidated local prostitutes. Imaginative descriptions of "Leather Apron", using crude Jewish stereotypes, frequently appeared in the press in the days following Nichols's murder, although some sections of the London press dismissed this theory as "a mythical outgrowth of the reporter's fancy".

John Pizer, a Polish Jew who made footwear from leather, was known by the name "Leather Apron" Despite there being no direct evidence against him, he was arrested by a Sergeant William Thicke on 10 September. Although Pizer claimed to the contrary, Thicke knew of Pizer's reputation, and that he was known locally by this name. A search of Pizer's home recovered five long-bladed knives. Nonetheless, Pizer was soon released after the confirmation of his alibis on the nights of the two most recent Whitechapel murders.

Pizer later successfully obtained monetary compensation from at least one newspaper that had named him as the murderer.

Funeral
Mary Ann Nichols was buried on the afternoon of 6 September 1888. She was laid to rest in the City of London Cemetery, located within the east London district of Newham. Her body was transported to the cemetery in a hearse supplied by a Hanbury Street undertaker named Henry Smith. The funeral cortège consisted of the hearse carrying her coffin and two mourning coaches, which carried her father, estranged husband, and three of her children. Several thousand people observed the cortège travel from the mortuary to the cemetery.

Nichols's coffin was of polished elm, with a brass plaque bearing the inscription, 'Mary Ann Nichols, aged 42; died August 31, 1888'. She was buried in a public grave numbered 210752 (on the edge of the current Memorial Garden).

In late 1996, the cemetery authorities decided to formally mark Nichols's unmarked grave with a plaque.

Media

Film
 A Study in Terror (1965). This film casts Chrisiane Mayback as Mary Ann Nichols.
 Love Lies Bleeding (1999). A drama film directed by William Tannen. Nichols is portrayed by Nancy Bishop in this film.
 From Hell. (2001). Directed by the Hughes Brothers, the film casts Annabelle Apsion as Mary Ann Nichols.

Television
 The Real Jack the Ripper (2010). Directed by David Mortin, this series casts Stephne Haliburn as Mary Ann Nichols and was first broadcast on 31 August 2010.
 Jack the Ripper: The Definitive Story (2011). A two-hour documentary which references original police reports and eyewitness accounts pertaining to the Whitechapel Murderer. Nichols is portrayed by actress Lorayne Constance in this documentary.

Drama
 Jack, the Last Victim (2005). This musical casts Marissa Merewood as Mary Ann Nichols.

See also
 Cold case
 List of serial killers before 1900
 Unsolved murders in the United Kingdom

Notes

References

Bibliography
 Begg, Paul (2003). Jack the Ripper: The Definitive History. London: Pearson Education. 
 Begg, Paul (2006). Jack the Ripper: The Facts. London: Anova Books. 
 Bell, Neil R. A. (2016). Capturing Jack the Ripper: In the Boots of a Bobby in Victorian England. Stroud: Amberley Publishing. 
 Cook, Andrew (2009). Jack the Ripper. Stroud, Gloucestershire: Amberley Publishing. 
 Eddleston, John J. (2002). Jack the Ripper: An Encyclopedia. London: Metro Books. 
 Evans, Stewart P.; Gainey, P. (2006) [1995]. Jack the Ripper: First American Serial Killer. New York: Kodansha. 
 Evans, Stewart P.; Rumbelow, Donald (2006). Jack the Ripper: Scotland Yard Investigates. Stroud: Sutton. 
 Evans, Stewart P.; Skinner, Keith (2000). The Ultimate Jack the Ripper Sourcebook: An Illustrated Encyclopedia. London: Constable and Robinson. 
 Fido, Martin (1987). The Crimes, Death and Detection of Jack the Ripper. Vermont: Trafalgar Square. 
 Gordon, R. Michael (2000). Alias Jack the Ripper: Beyond the Usual Whitechapel Suspects. North Carolina: McFarland Publishing. 
 Harris, Melvin (1994). The True Face of Jack the Ripper. London: Michael O'Mara Books Ltd. 
 Holmes, Ronald M.; Holmes, Stephen T. (2002). Profiling Violent Crimes: An Investigative Tool. Thousand Oaks, California: Sage Publications, Inc. 
 Honeycombe, Gordon (1982). The Murders of the Black Museum: 1870–1970, London: Bloomsbury Books. 
 Lane, Brian (1995). Chronicle of 20th Century Murder, Wiltshire: Select Editions. 
 Lynch, Terry; Davies, David (2008). Jack the Ripper: The Whitechapel Murderer. Hertfordshire: Wordsworth Editions. 
 Marriott, Trevor (2005). Jack the Ripper: The 21st Century Investigation. London: John Blake. 
 Rumbelow, Donald (2004). The Complete Jack the Ripper: Fully Revised and Updated. Penguin Books. 
 Sugden, Philip (2002). The Complete History of Jack the Ripper. Carroll & Graf Publishers. 
 Waddell, Bill (1993). The Black Museum: New Scotland Yard. London: Little, Brown and Company. 
 White, Jerry (2007). London in the Nineteenth Century. London: Jonathan Cape. 
 Whittington-Egan, Richard; Whittington-Egan, Molly (1992). The Murder Almanac. Glasgow: Neil Wilson Publishing. 
 Whittington-Egan, Richard (2013). Jack the Ripper: The Definitive Casebook. Stroud: Amberley Publishing. 
 Woods, Paul; Baddeley, Gavin (2009). Saucy Jack: The Elusive Ripper. Hersham, Surrey: Ian Allan Publishing.

External links

 31 August 1888 Evening News article detailing the murder of Mary Ann Nichols
 6 November 1888 Maitland Mercury news article detailing the inquest into the murder of Mary Ann Nichols
 2009 Daily Telegraph article detailing the victims of Jack the Ripper
 BBC News article pertaining to the murders committed by Jack the Ripper
 Casebook: Jack the Ripper
 The Whitechapel Murder Victims: Mary Ann Nichols at whitechapeljack.com

1845 births
1880s murders in London
1888 deaths
1888 murders in the United Kingdom
19th-century English women
August 1888 events
English female prostitutes
English murder victims
Female murder victims
Jack the Ripper victims
People of the Victorian era